Madabhushi Rangadorai (born 8 November 1937), better known by his pen name Randor Guy, is an Indian lawyer, columnist and film and legal historian associated with the English language newspaper The Hindu. He is also the official editor of the weekly column "Blast from the Past" that appears in The Hindu.

Early life
Randor Guy's original name was Rangadorai, but his pen name later became official. He graduated in BSc and B. L. from Madras University and commenced his career as a lawyer. After practising as a lawyer for a short time, he quit his job and joined a firm called Paterson and Co. where he worked for five years. In 1976, he resigned to devote all his time to writing.

Work as a film historian
Guy has been writing books on history and films since 1967. He became popular when his article on Frank Capra was purchased by the United States Information Agency for use as a reference work. As of 2008, he remains the only non-American whose work has been acquired as reference material by the Government of the United States of America.

Guy is a regular columnist for such newspapers as the Mylapore Times, The Hindu and The Indian Express. He also writes for the film magazine, Screen. He writes on a variety of topics though he is mainly popular as a film historian and critic.

Films
Guy has written the screenplays for a few short documentaries and feature films. He has also produced a few advertisement films. In 1999, he scripted a 100-minute feature film in English titled Tales of The Kama Sutra: The Perfumed Garden for a Hollywood film company, directed by Jag Mundhra. It was subsequently dubbed into Hindi, Tamil and Telugu as Brahmachari. He later worked with the film's cinematographer, Ashok Kumar, on his trilingual production, Kaama (1999). He has written a Sinhalese film called Paradise Peak based on a best-selling crime novel written by him. His recent works include Kamasutra Nights: Maya starring actress Namitha. Maya is Namitha's first film in English.

Awards and felicitations
On 12 November 2007, during a function commemorating the fifth anniversary of Samudra, a magazine dedicated to art and culture, Guy was awarded the Gnana Samudra award in recognition of his contributions to the arts.

Books 
 (Fiction)

 (Fiction – Telugu)
 (Fiction – Telugu)
 (True Crime-Tamil)

 (Film History – Govt. of Tamil Nadu)

 (Fiction)
Chitale (Biography)
(Novelization of a Hollywood film shot in India)

Notes

References

20th-century births
Living people
Indian film critics
Year of birth uncertain
20th-century pseudonymous writers
Writers from Chennai
University of Madras alumni
Legal historians
Indian film historians
The Hindu Group
Indian male screenwriters
Indian columnists